Hylan Plaza (formerly called Fox Plaza after its former anchor tenant) was an open-air shopping center in the New Dorp neighborhood of Staten Island, New York City, United States.

History 
Hylan Plaza debuted in 1966 with the opening of a Fox Plaza, now United Artists Movie Theater, and a W.T. Grant department store, now Kmart. By 1968 a new Garber Brothers department store, now a Toys "R" Us/Babies "R" Us combination, and a Pathmark supermarket were added as anchors to the shopping center.

Hylan Plaza went through a major renovation in 2003 which included an expansion and complete remodeling of Pathmark, new grass and tree planted medians, new lampposts, and the closing of several secondary driveways and the causeway to travel between both the main (Hylan Boulevard) and Mill Road parking lots.

Throughout 2015–2017, the tenants closed and or moved in preparation for a new replacement shopping center, named "The Boulevard". The plaza was demolished in 2017. In 2020 retail space was being sold at "The Boulevard".

References

External links 

Shopping malls established in 1966
Demolished shopping malls in the United States
Shopping malls in New York City
Commercial buildings in Staten Island
1966 establishments in New York City
Demolished buildings and structures in Staten Island
New Dorp, Staten Island